Joggin Bridge is a community in the Canadian province of Nova Scotia, located in The Municipality of the District of Digby in Digby County.

References
Joggin Bridge on Destination Nova Scotia

Communities in Digby County, Nova Scotia
General Service Areas in Nova Scotia